Mayur is a given name. Notable people with the name include:

Mohit Mayur Jayaprakash (born 1993), Indian tennis player
Mayur Lakhani (born 1960), British doctor who works as a general practitioner
Mayur Madhvani, Ugandan businessman, entrepreneur, and industrialist of Indian origin
Naveen Mayur (1978–2010), Indian actor known for his work in Kannada cinema
Mayur Puri, Indian screenwriter, lyricist, actor and film-maker working in Mumbai
Mayur Verma (born 1991), Indian television actor known for playing Bunny in Jeannie Aur Juju
Mayur Vyas, Indian voice actor who does dubbing into Hindi for films and television programs